The 1999 Asian Youth Girls Volleyball Championship was held in Singapore from 4 to 9 June 1999.

Pools composition
The teams are seeded based on their final ranking at the 1997 Asian Youth Girls Volleyball Championship.

Preliminary round

Pool A

|}

|}

Pool B

|}

|}

Final round
 The results and the points of the matches between the same teams that were already played during the preliminary round shall be taken into account for the final round.

Classification 5th–8th

|}

|}

Championship

|}

|}

Final standing

References
 www.jva.or.jp

External links
FIVB

A
V
V
Asian women's volleyball championships
Volleyball competitions in Singapore